Turiasaurus (meaning "Turia lizard") is a genus of sauropod dinosaurs. It is known from a single fossil specimen representing the species Turiasaurus riodevensis, found in the Kimmeridgian Villar del Arzobispo Formation of Teruel, Spain.

Description 

Turiasaurus is believed to be the largest dinosaur ever found in Europe, and is among the largest dinosaurs known. The length of its skull is 70 centimetres, which is not too large. According to the paleontologist Luis Alcalá, this is because a larger head might have caused Turiasaurus to break its neck.

Phylogenetic analysis shows that Turiasaurus lies outside of the Neosauropoda division and belongs to a new clade, Turiasauria, together with Losillasaurus and Galveosaurus.

History 

Fragmentary remains of this animal, including an articulated left forelimb (holotype), skull fragments, teeth, vertebrae and ribs, have been found in terrestrial deposits of the Villar del Arzobispo Formation of Riodeva (Teruel Province, Spain). A forelimb from Portugal. is now seen as Zby atlanticus. The type species, Turiasaurus riodevensis, was formally described by Royo-Torres, Cobos & Alcala, in 2006. In the early 2010s, excavations were made east of Madrid that uncovered the most complete fossil of such creatures in the whole world.

References

External links 
 BBC report on Turiasaurus
 Fact-Sheet with picture (in german)''
 Fundación Conjunto Paleontológico de Teruel''

Turiasauria
Kimmeridgian life
Late Jurassic dinosaurs of Europe
Jurassic Spain
Fossils of Spain
Fossil taxa described in 2006